Urocanase (also known as imidazolonepropionate hydrolase or urocanate hydratase) is the enzyme that catalyzes the second step in the degradation of histidine, the hydration of urocanate into imidazolonepropionate.

Urocanase is coded for by the UROC1 gene, located on the 3rd chromosome in humans. The protein itself is composed of 676 amino acids which then fold, producing the final product which has 2 identical subunits, making the enzyme a homodimer.

To catalyze the hydrolysis of urocanate in the catabolic pathway of L-histidine the enzyme utilizes its two NAD+ (Nicotinamide Adnene Dinucleotide) groups. The NAD+ groups act as electrophiles, attaching to the top carbon of the urocanate which leads to sigmatropic rearrangement of the urocanate molecule. This rearrangement allows for the addition of a water molecule, converting the urocanate into 4,5-dihydro-4-oxo-5-imidazolepropanoate.

 urocanate + H2O  4,5-dihydro-4-oxo-5-imidazolepropanoate

Inherited deficiency of urocanase leads to elevated levels of urocanic acid in the urine, a condition known as urocanic aciduria.

Urocanase is found in some bacteria (gene hutU), in the liver of many vertebrates and has also been found in the plant Trifolium repens (white clover). Urocanase is a protein of about 60 Kd, it binds tightly to NAD+ and uses it as an electrophil cofactor. A conserved cysteine has been found to be important for the catalytic mechanism and could be involved in the binding of the NAD+.

References

External links 
 
 

Protein families
EC 4.2.1